Çanakkale Archaeological Museum was a museum in Çanakkale, Turkey. Its contents have been moved to the 2018-established Troy Museum ( or Truva Müzesi), close to the excavation site of the ancient Greek city of Troy. The museum site is now home to the Mehmet Akif Ersoy Provincial Public Library.

Çanakkale is situated on the Anatolian side of the Dardanelles Strait. It is close to famous Troy of the antiquity. The Dardanelles campaign of World War I is known as Çanakkale Savaşı in Turkish.

In 1960, an abandoned church was opened as a museum.
 A minibus, starting at the Minibus station at the bridge over the Çanakkale Çay bridge of the Atatürk Caddesi, provides a regular service to Troy and the new museum. 

The following text was found to be correct for the Troy Museum: The main items in the exhibition halls are artifacts from various ruins around Çanakkele such as a Troia, Assos, Apollon, Smintheion, Tenedos and Alexandria Troas. Some of the items are marble sculptures, steles, illumination gadgets, terracota and bronze kitchenware, glassware and ornaments. A colored sarcophagus from the Achaemenid Empire and Polyxena sarcophagus are among the notable items. There are also some ethnographic items.

See also
Troy Museum

Gallery

References

Buildings and structures in Çanakkale Province
Archaeological museums in Turkey
1984 establishments in Turkey
Museums established in 1984
Tourist attractions in Çanakkale Province
Defunct museums in Turkey